Engapuzha  is a small town in Kozhikode district in the state of Kerala, India.

Demographics
 India census, Engapuzha had a population of 18,205 with 8,944 males and 9,261 females.

Bus station
Engapuzha bus station has the distinction of being built right on a river. The town of Engapuzha is crowded and traffic snarls are a constant issue. Engapuzha connects to neighboring places like Payona, Nalekra, Poolod, Kunhukulam, Kakavayal, Karikulam Kuppayakode, Aachi, Kalpetta, Parapenpara, Kanchamvayal, Choyod, Kolamala, Thamarassery and Kodenchery.

Transportation
This village connects to other parts of India through Calicut city on the west and Thamarassery town on the east. NH 66 passes through Kozhikode and the northern stretch connects to Mangalore, Goa and Mumbai. The southern stretch connects to Cochin and Trivandrum. The eastern NH 766 going through Adivaram connects to Kalpetta, Mysore and Bangalore. The nearest airports are at Kannur and Kozhikode. The nearest railway station is at Kozhikode.

Places

Payona

Payona is a small town  from Engapuzha town. Nowadays more houses are built in the area and the area is developing as a younger generation has acquired good educational qualifications and is working or doing business. The main sources of income are agriculture and animal rearing.

Nalekra
Nalekra is a small place towards south from Engapuzha town. It takes 10 minutes walk to reach Nalekra and there are at least 20 families staying in this area. Known personalities like Karimbayil Alikunhi Haji (late) is one of the early settlers in the area. He and his family settled from Palakutty (Koduvally) during mid 1950s. During that time the place was with three or four families only. In the beginning he focused on coconut plantation and animal rearing. Nalekra is surrounded by mainly coconut trees, limited paddy fields, and rubber plantations. People’s main source of income is from agriculture and animal rearing.

Mammunippadi
It's a small village, where most of the people are engaged in agriculture. Mostly rubber, paddy, coconut, and arecanut are cultivated here.

Poolod 

Kanjamvayal

References

Villages in Kozhikode district
Thamarassery area